Mildred Mott Wedel (née Mildred Ingram Mott;  – ) was an American scholar of Great Plains archaeology and ethnohistory. She was one of the first professionally trained female archaeologists and was distinguished in her field. Many of her publications were about the Siouan people, and wrote several important articles on French exploration in the Central and Southern Plains.

Early life and education 
Her father was a noted journalist and professor at State University of Iowa (now the University of Iowa).

She attended University of Iowa and received a B.A. degree (1934) in history; followed by anthropology studies at the University of Chicago with Sara Julia Jones Tucker (1907–1968); and studies at the University of New Mexico's Jemez Field School in archaeology in the summer of 1935. In 1936, Wedel assisted Ellison Orr (1857–1951) at the Hill Mound Group and at Bear Effigy Mound at Brazell's Island, Allamakee County, Iowa. She joined the University of Chicago Dendrochronology Lab in 1937 and 1938 to the Kincaid Mounds field expedition under Florence Hawley. Wedel received a M.A. degree (1938) from the University of Chicago, under Fay-Cooper Cole. Her thesis, "The Relation of Historic Indian Tribes to Archaeological Manifestations in Iowa" (1938) was the most complete-to-date study of Iowa archaeology and Iowa-based Native American tribes.

Career 
Wedel served as a field director at an excavation project attributed to the Woodland period near Webster City and the Boone River channel, under the supervision of Charles Reuben Keyes in June and July 1938.

On August 12, 1939, she married archaeologist Waldo Rudolph Wedel and together they had three children. At the time of their marriage, her husband was the assistant curator of archaeology at the United States National Museum (now the Smithsonian Institution). In the summer of 1940, the Wedels' worked together on an archaeological project in Kansas. 

From 1945 after World War II until the 1960s, she helped her husband with the Smithsonian Institution's salvage archaeological projects held primary in the Dakotas; and she took her educational experiences from Sara Jones Tucker and expanded it by focusing on her own ethnohistory research (which is an overlap between anthropology and history). She did extensive research on French exploration in the Central and Southern Plains, specifically Jean-Baptiste Bénard de la Harpe, Sieur de la Harpe, Pierre-Charles Le Sueur, Claude Charles Du Tisne, and Jean-Baptiste Trutdeau. She published on the origins of Plains Caddoan culture, and on the Iowa and Wichita people.  

In 1951, the Wedel family (including their children) attended an excavation at the Cheyenne River Site in South Dakota. In the 1960s and 1970s, she worked as a consultant for the Ioway and Otoe people to help supplement their federal land lawsuits. Other consultant work was for the 1700 Ioway Indian Farm at Living History Farms, an open-air museum in Urbandale, Iowa. In 1974, she was hired as a research associate at the Smithsonian Institution.

Awards and honors 
In 1980, Wedel won the Keyes/Orr Award for Distinguished Service from the Iowa Archeological Society; and in 1992 she was awarded the Distinguished Service Award for lifetime achievement from the Plains Anthropological Society. In 1985, the American Anthropological Association's Committee on the Status of Women in Anthropology honored her. In 1988, there was a symposium at the Plains Conference  in her dedication.

Death and legacy 
Wedel died on 4 September 1995 in Boulder, Colorado.

Wedel is one of the women featured in the Plaza of Heroines (1996) at Iowa State University in Ames, Iowa.

Publications

See also 
 Archaeology of the Americas
 List of archaeologists
 List of women anthropologists

References 

1912 births
1995 deaths
American women archaeologists
American ethnologists
American women historians
University of Iowa alumni
University of Chicago alumni
Smithsonian Institution people
American women anthropologists